Carodista is a genus of moths in the family Lecithoceridae. The genus was erected by Edward Meyrick in 1925.

Species
Carodista afghana Gozmány, 1978
Carodista bathroptila (Meyrick, 1929)
Carodista citrostrota (Meyrick, 1911)
Carodista cultrata Park, 1999
Carodista epigompha (Meyrick, 1910)
Carodista fabajuxta C. S. Wu & Park, 1999
Carodista flagitiosa (Meyrick, 1914)
Carodista flavicana C. S. Wu, 2003
Carodista fushanensis Park, 2000
Carodista galeodes (Meyrick, 1910)
Carodista geraea (Meyrick, 1911)
Carodista gracilis (Gozmány, 1978)
Carodista grypotatos Park, 2001
Carodista isomila (Meyrick, 1911)
Carodista liui Wu, 2002
Carodista lycopis (Meyrick, 1911)
Carodista melicrata (Meyrick, 1910)
Carodista montana Park, 1999
Carodista niphomitra (Meyrick, 1931)
Carodista notolychna (Meyrick, 1936)
Carodista nubigena (Meyrick, 1911)
Carodista paroristis (Meyrick, 1911)
Carodista tribrachia Park, 2001
Carodista trichopla (Meyrick, 1929)
Carodista wilpattuae Park, 2001

References

 , 1999: Lecithoceridae (Lepidoptera) of Taiwan (II): Subfamily Lecithocerinae: Genus Lecithocera Herrich-Schäffer and its allies. Zoological Studies 39 (4): 360-374 
  & , 2001: Additional faunistic data and discussions of Lecithoceridae (Lepidoptera) from Sri Lanka, with descriptions of seven new species. Insecta Koreana, 18 (2): 139–152. Full article: .
 , 2002: A new species of genus Carodista Meyrick from Beijing, China (Lepidoptera: Lecithoceridae). Acta Zootaxonomica Sinica 27 (1): 136–138.
 , 2003: Two new species of Lecithoceridae (Lepidoptera) from Mt. Fanjing, Guizhou Province, China. Entomotaxonomia 25 (3): 211–212.
 , 1999: Taxonomic review of the Lecithoceridae (Lepidoptera) in Sri Lanka VI. The subfamily Lecithocerinae: Genera Alciphanes and others. Insecta Koreana 16 (2): 131–142. Full article: .

External links

 
Lecithocerinae
Moth genera